Yesterdays is the eleventh studio album by the American punk rock band Pennywise, which was released on July 15, 2014.  It contains previously unrecorded compositions (with the exception of "No Way Out" and "Slowdown", which appeared on 1989's A Word from the Wise and 1993's Unknown Road respectively) by their late bassist Jason Thirsk. Yesterdays is also Pennywise's first album with singer Jim Lindberg after he left the band in 2009 and returned in 2012. "Violence Never Ending" was released to radio on June 23, 2014.

Track listing

Personnel

Pennywise
 Jim Lindberg – vocals
 Fletcher Dragge – guitar
 Randy Bradbury – bass
 Byron McMackin – drums

Additional
 Jason Thirsk – songwriting, bass (Band Practice '89)
 Ian Petersen – producer, engineer
 Gene Grimaldi – mastering
 Fred Hidalgo – logo design, cover art
 Additional art and design provided by Byron McMackin and PENNYWISE

Charts

References

2014 albums
Pennywise (band) albums
Epitaph Records albums